Cabanillas may also refer to:
Cabanillas del Monte, a locality of Torrecaballeros, Segovia, Spain
Cabanillas del Pirón, uninhabited of Adrada de Pirón, Segovia, Spain
Cabanillas, a locality of Cuadros, Leon, Spain
Cabanillas, a locality of Alentisque, León, Spain
Cabanillas de San Justo, a locality of Noceda del Bierzo, León, Spain
Cabanillas, a municipality located in Navarre, Spain
Cabanillas de la Sierra,  a municipality of Madrid, Spain
Cabanillas del Campo,  a municipality in Guadalajara, Castile-La Mancha, Spain
Cabanillas District, a district of San Román Province, Peru

People with the surname
Carlos Asensio Cabanillas (1896 – 1969), Spanish soldier and statesman
Isabel Cabanillas (died 2020), Mexican artist
Jose Julio Cabanillas Serrano (born 1958), Spanish poet
José M. Cabanillas (1901 – 1979), United States Navy rear admiral 
María del Tránsito Cabanillas (1821 – 1885), beatified Argentine Roman Catholic
Mercedes Cabanillas(born 1947), Peruvian politician
Nuria Cabanillas (born 1980), Spanish gymnast
Pío Cabanillas Alonso(born 1958), Spanish politician
Pío Cabanillas Gallas (1923 – 1991), Spanish jurist and politician